Zachary Levi Pugh (born September 29, 1980) is an American actor. He received critical acclaim for starring as Chuck Bartowski in the series Chuck, and as the title character in Shazam! and its 2023 sequel, as a part of the DC Extended Universe.

He voiced Eugene Fitzherbert in the 2010 animated film Tangled, where he performed "I See the Light" with Mandy Moore; the song won a Grammy Award for Best Song Written for Visual Media. He reprised the voice role in the 2012 short film Tangled Ever After and in 2017, Rapunzel's Tangled Adventure, a Disney Channel television series based on the film. He appeared in the Marvel Cinematic Universe films Thor: The Dark World and Thor: Ragnarok as Fandral. Levi starred as Georg Nowack in the 2016 Broadway revival of She Loves Me opposite Laura Benanti, for which he received a Tony Award nomination.

In 2022 Levi published a memoir/self-help book titled Radical Love: Learning to Accept Yourself and Others.

Early life
Levi was born in Lake Charles, Louisiana, the son of Susan Marie (née Hoctor; 1950–2015) and Darrell Pugh. He has English, German, and Welsh ancestry. When he was a child, his family moved across several states before returning to their home in Ventura, California, where he attended Buena High School for four years. He began acting on stage at the age of six, performing lead roles in regional productions such as Grease, The Outsiders, Oklahoma!, Oliver!, The Wizard of Oz, and Big River at the Ojai Art Center.

Career

Acting

Levi first appeared in the FX television movie Big Shot: Confessions of a Campus Bookie. He played Kipp Steadman on the ABC sitcom Less than Perfect. He also portrayed a potential boyfriend of Charisma Carpenter's character, Jane, in the then-ABC Family television movie See Jane Date. Levi was slated to be a lead in an ABC pilot called Three for the 2004/2005 television season, but the show was not picked up.

He landed the starring role in Chuck in 2007. Levi and his Chuck co-star Yvonne Strahovski were both nominated for Best Action Actor and Actress Choice TV Series for the Teen Choice Awards 2010 where they both won and presented. In the summer of 2008, Levi was named one of Entertainment Weekly's Top Thirty People Under Thirty. He later starred in the film Alvin and the Chipmunks: The Squeakquel in the lead role as Dave's cousin Toby Seville. He starred in the 2010 Disney-animated feature film Tangled, which is based on the popular fairy tale Rapunzel. He voices Flynn Rider, a bandit who finds refuge in Rapunzel's tower. He provided narration in the 2011 film Under the Boardwalk: The Monopoly Story, a documentary about the game of Monopoly. Levi hosted the 2011 Spike Video Game Awards.

BuddyTV ranked him #97 on its list of "TV's Sexiest Men of 2011". Levi landed the male lead in the 2012 TV pilot Let It Go, which would have aired on Fox, but was not picked up. Levi hosted the web documentaries Tomb Raider The Final Hours, going behind the scenes of the new Tomb Raider game. He was originally to portray Fandral in Thor, but had to drop out due to scheduling conflicts with Chuck. He did play the role in the sequels, Thor: The Dark World (2013), after original actor Josh Dallas had scheduling conflicts of his own, and briefly in Thor: Ragnarok (2017). Levi made his Broadway debut in a production of the musical comedy First Date in August 2013.

In January 2015, it was announced that Levi would be a lead member of the cast of NBC's 13-episode miniseries Heroes Reborn as Luke Collins. The show was not picked up for a second season. He also guest-starred as Abraham Lincoln in the Hulu original series Deadbeat.

Levi joined the cast of the Broadway revival of She Loves Me in the lead role of Georg, alongside Laura Benanti as Amalia. It opened at Studio 54 on March 17, 2016, after previews on February 19, 2016, for a limited engagement through June 12. The run was later extended through July 10, when it closed. The production received high critical praise, receiving 5 Stars from The Guardian and was selected as a Critics' Pick for The New York Times. Levi was nominated for a Tony Award for Best Performance by an Actor in a Leading Role in a Musical for his performance. Critics praised Levi's performance of Georg, noting that his portrayal is "suave and handsome at times, disarmingly nebbishy at others," and that he "[exudes] sweet modesty and just a pinch of hauteur." The production had a historic livestreamed performance on June 30, 2016, with Levi and the cast participating in the first livestreamed show in Broadway history.

In 2017, Levi reprised his role as Flynn Rider in a Disney Channel Original Movie titled Tangled: Before Ever After. This movie continued the story as a regular series titled Rapunzel's Tangled Adventure, which lasted for 3 seasons, premiering on March 24, 2017, and concluding March 1, 2020. The series is based on the 2010 film Tangled and features the returning voices of Mandy Moore and Zachary Levi.

In 2018, Levi appeared as Dr. Benjamin Ettenberg, a love interest for the main character, Miriam 'Midge' Maisel, in the second season of The Marvelous Mrs. Maisel. With the series' other principal cast members, Levi won the Screen Actors Guild Award for Outstanding Performance by an Ensemble in a Comedy Series at SAG's January 2019 awards ceremony.

In 2019, Levi starred as the title character in New Line Cinema and Warner Bros.' superhero comedy feature film Shazam!, an entry in the DC Extended Universe franchise. In the film, Levi's Shazam character (also known as Captain Marvel) is the superpowered alter-ego of a teenaged boy, Billy Batson (played by Asher Angel), who retains his childish personality in his adult form similar to the 1988 20th Century Fox comedy Big.

After a nearly two-year hiatus away from acting, Levi starred in a supporting role on The Mauritanian, which was directed by Kevin Macdonald and starred Tahar Rahim and Jodie Foster in the lead roles. He is also set to star in two films by the Kingdom Story Company: the leading role of Kurt Warner in the biographical sports drama American Underdog, and LaRette in The Unbreakable Boy. He is set to reprise as Billy Batson/Shazam in Shazam! Fury of the Gods, set to release on March 17, 2023.

Music
In April 2010, Katharine McPhee released a preview of a music video to cinemas for her single "Terrified". Levi duets with her on the song (which was re-recorded; the original album version features Jason Reeves) and appears in the music video singing with McPhee. On May 3, 2010, the song was previewed on the Entertainment Weekly website and made available for purchase on iTunes. The full video premiered May 7, 2010 on the music video website Vevo. Levi financed Kendall Payne's album Grown after she was dropped by her label, Capitol Records.

On the soundtrack of the movie Tangled, Levi sings "I See the Light" (with costar Mandy Moore) and "I've Got a Dream". In honor of the Oscar nomination for Best Original Song, Levi and Moore performed "I See the Light" at the 83rd Academy Awards. Levi has also been a guest member of Band from TV, a band made up of actors from various American television shows.

Personal life

Levi is a sports car and motorcycle enthusiast and owns a 2009 Nissan GT-R. He is an avid gamer, having first played Super Mario Bros., and appreciates video games for their ability to provide interactive stories. He is a Libertarian.

Levi currently lives in Bastrop, Texas, in the Austin area.

In September 2010, Levi started his own company, The Nerd Machine. He participated in the Celebrity All Star Game at NBA All Star Weekend 2011, playing for the team coached by Magic Johnson.

On June 16, 2014, Canadian actress Missy Peregrym announced that she and Levi had married in Maui, Hawaii. They filed for divorce in April 2015, with the separation date listed in court documents as December 3, 2014.

On May 21, 2019, Active Minds, a mental health charity, announced that Levi would be an ambassador for the organization.

Levi has been open about his struggles with mental health and suicidal thoughts, both on social media and in his 2022 memoir Radical Love.

In a 2022 episode of the podcast The Joe Rogan Experience, Levi described Canadian psychologist Jordan Peterson as "one of the deepest thinkers I've ever heard break down human behavior" who "has a lot of integrity".

Religion
Levi was raised a Christian. In a 2002 interview with Relevant Magazine, he said:My job on my set, I believe, is to first just love people and gain that trust with people where they know that I really do love them and care about their well-being, so that when they are running into problems, they will hopefully, at some point, come to me and ask me, 'What is your peace all about? What is your comfort all about? Where do you get your love? Where do you get your talents?' And I can turn to them and say without blinking, 'Jesus Christ.'

In a 2018 interview with Michael Rosenbaum, Levi said, "I'm very spiritual, but not particularly religious." While avowing belief in God, he said, "[Religion] is, in my opinion, very destructive to what I believe the true heart and spirit then essence of who God is."

In a 2021 interview with The Christian Post, he said working on the movie American Underdog bolstered his Christian faith, and in getting to work on this project, "it feels like God's fingerprints were all over it."

Though he has no Jewish ancestry, Levi is often incorrectly perceived to be Jewish due to his stage name. In a 2016 interview, he claimed that he had been turned down for a number of roles because he was considered "too Jewish" for the part.

Filmography

Film

Television

Video games

Internet

Theater

Discography
 "Terrified" (2010) Performed by Katharine McPhee featuring Zachary Levi.
 "I See the Light" (2010) Performed by Zachary Levi and Mandy Moore for the film Tangled.
 First Date (Original Broadway Cast Recording)
 She Loves Me (2016 Broadway Cast Recording)

Live performances
On February 27, 2011, Levi performed "I See the Light" with Mandy Moore at the 83rd Academy Awards. On June 12, 2016, Levi performed the title song from She Loves Me, as part of the medley presented on the 70th Tony Awards. He has also performed live in various programs from childhood.

Awards and nominations

Film

Television

Theater

References

External links

 
 
 
 
 2019 Christmas commercial

1980 births
Living people
21st-century American male actors
21st-century American singers
21st-century American male singers
American libertarians
American male film actors
American male television actors
American male video game actors
American male voice actors
American people of English descent
American people of German descent
American people of Welsh descent
American Christians
Male actors from Louisiana
Musicians from Lake Charles, Louisiana
People from Ventura, California
Articles containing video clips
Singers from Louisiana
Theatre World Award winners